Jingles is the first greatest hits album from the Australian rock band, Regurgitator. The album was released in October 2002 and is the band's final released on Warner Music Australia.

The album contains songs from their first four studio albums and various EPs and includes one previously unreleased song, "Disco Crazy".

Track listing
"Kong Foo Sing"
"I Wanna Be a Nudist"
"! (The Song Formerly Known As)"
"Hullabaloo"
"Track 1"
"Superstraight"
"I Sucked a Lot of Cock"
"Blubber Boy"
"Happiness"
"Everyday Formula"
"FSO"
"Miffy's Simplicity"
"Polyester Girl"
"I Like It Like That"
"Black Bugs"
"Freshmint"
"Couldn't Do it"
"Modern Life"
"Fat Cop"
"Crush the Losers"
"Disco Crazy"

Release history

References

Regurgitator albums
Compilation albums by Australian artists
2002 greatest hits albums